Waushara County is a county located in the U.S. state of Wisconsin. As of the 2020 census, the population was 24,520. Its county seat is Wautoma.

History
Waushara County was established by an act of the Wisconsin Legislature on February 15, 1851. It originally consisted of a single organized Town of Waushara. In 1852 the county achieved full organization. The county seat was first located at Sacramento and was relocated to Wautoma in 1854 after a bitter fight between proponents of the two places. The name is of Ho-Chunk origin and is believed to mean "good land".

Geography

Major highways
  Interstate 39
  U.S. Highway 51
  Highway 21 (Wisconsin)
  Highway 22 (Wisconsin)
  Highway 49 (Wisconsin)
  Highway 73 (Wisconsin)

Buses
List of intercity bus stops in Wisconsin

Airports
 Wautoma Municipal Airport  serves Waushara County and the surrounding communities
 Wild Rose Idlewild Airport  also serves Waushara County and the surrounding communities

Adjacent counties
 Portage County - north
 Waupaca County - northeast
 Winnebago County - east
 Green Lake County - south
 Marquette County - south
 Adams County - west

Climate

Demographics

2020 census
As of the census of 2020, the population was 24,520. The racial makeup of the county was 89.9% White, 1.6% Black or African American, 0.6% Native American, 0.4% Asian, 0.1% Pacific Islander, 2.8% from other races, and 4.6% from two or more races. Ethnically, the population was 6.9% Hispanic or Latino of any race.

2000 census

As of the census of 2000, there were 23,154 people, 9,336 households, and 6,581 families residing in the county. The population density was 37 people per square mile (14/km2). There were 13,667 housing units at an average density of 22 per square mile (8/km2). The racial makeup of the county was 96.80% White, 0.27% Black or African American, 0.31% Native American, 0.35% Asian, 0.03% Pacific Islander, 1.36% from other races, and 0.89% from two or more races.  3.66% of the population were Hispanic or Latino of any race. 47.5% were of German, 9.1% Polish, 5.9% Irish, 5.7% American and 5.6% English ancestry. 94.5% spoke English, 3.4% Spanish and 1.4% German as their first language.

There were 9,336 households, out of which 27.60% had children under the age of 18 living with them, 60.00% were married couples living together, 6.70% had a female householder with no husband present, and 29.50% were non-families. 24.90% of all households were made up of individuals, and 11.90% had someone living alone who was 65 years of age or older. The average household size was 2.43 and the average family size was 2.89.

In the county, the population was spread out, with 23.50% under the age of 18, 6.00% from 18 to 24, 24.90% from 25 to 44, 26.30% from 45 to 64, and 19.20% who were 65 years of age or older. The median age was 42 years. For every 100 females there were 101.60 males. For every 100 females age 18 and over, there were 98.80 males.

In 2017, there were 222 births, giving a general fertility rate of 67.3 births per 1000 women aged 15–44, the 22nd highest rate out of all 72 Wisconsin counties. Of these, 19 of the births occurred at home. Additionally, there were 10 reported induced abortions performed on women of Waushara County residence in 2017.

Communities

Cities
 Berlin (mostly in Green Lake County)
 Wautoma (county seat)

Villages
 Coloma
 Hancock
 Lohrville
 Plainfield
 Redgranite
 Wild Rose

Towns

 Aurora
 Bloomfield
 Coloma
 Dakota
 Deerfield
 Hancock
 Leon
 Marion
 Mount Morris
 Oasis
 Plainfield
 Poy Sippi
 Richford
 Rose
 Saxeville
 Springwater
 Warren
 Wautoma

Census-designated places
 Pine River
 Poy Sippi
 Tustin

Unincorporated communities

 Auroraville
 Bannerman
 Borth
 Brushville
 Dakota
 Fountain Valley
 Heffron (partially)
 Metz (partial)
 Mount Morris
 Richford
 Saxeville
 Silver Lake
 Spring Lake
 West Bloomfield

Ghost towns
 Rodney

Politics
Waushara County has long been one of the most Republican counties in Wisconsin. Only three Democrats have carried the county at a presidential level since the formation of the Republican Party – Franklin D. Roosevelt in 1932, Bill Clinton in 1996, and Barack Obama in 2008 – of whom only Roosevelt won an absolute majority. In 1936, when Roosevelt carried Wisconsin by a two-to-one majority, Alf Landon won Waushara County by double digits, while it was one of only three Wisconsin counties, alongside Walworth and Waupaca, to vote for Barry Goldwater over Lyndon Johnson in 1964. It has voted Republican since 2012.

In other statewide races, the county is equally Republican. Waushara County has never backed a Democrat for Governor since before 1900. Senators Herb Kohl in 2006 and William Proxmire in 1976 and 1970 did carry Waushara County when they swept every county in the state, but no other Democratic senatorial candidate has won the county since the Seventeenth Amendment.

See also
 National Register of Historic Places listings in Waushara County, Wisconsin

References

Further reading
 Portrait and Biographical Album of Green Lake, Marquette and Waushara Counties, Wisconsin. Chicago: Acme Publishing, 1890.

External links
 Waushara County website
 Waushara County map from the Wisconsin Department of Transportation

 
1852 establishments in Wisconsin
Populated places established in 1852